The following is a list of the mascots of each Canadian Football League team.

Current mascots

Other and former mascots
In 2003, the Calgary Stampeders introduced another mascot of sorts, "Quick Six," which is an actual horse. Quick Six continues a Stampeders tradition, which began in 1993, of having a horse charge down the east sidelines of a field, after Calgary scores a touchdown.

Out of the nine current CFL teams, only one has replaced their mascot, the Toronto Argonauts. Prior to Jason, the Argonauts had a mascot named "Scully," who was "traded" by the team, for Jason, in 2003. Jason was later, "promoted to starting mascot," in 2005. The now defunct franchise, the Ottawa Renegades' mascot was Ruffy the Beaver.

Nanook was the Edmonton Eskimos' only mascot from 1997–2003. Punter was introduced in 2004 as a secondary mascot. They were together from 2004-2020. When the Eskimos' name changed to the Elks, a polar bear would not make sense for a team named the Elks (as well as the animal relating to the controversial name), Nanook was retired in 2021, and was replaced by Spike, an elk. Punter did not get affected by this change. Today, Punter is still the secondary mascot while Spike is the primary.

The Winnipeg Blue Bombers original mascot was Captain Blue, who was introduced in the early 1970s. Since 1984 with the introduction of Buzz and Boomer, Captain Blue was made the secondary mascot. Captain Blue is always seen driving his full scale Blue Bomber biplane, which is a life like cartoon replica of the WWI biplane flown under the British Royal Airforce. After every touchdown and field goal scored by the Blue Bombers, Captain Blue drifts his biplane around the end zones.

Before Ottawa's mascot Big Joe, the city had a very prominent history of mascots.

References

Canadian Football League mascots
Lists of mascots